William Ward, 3rd Viscount Dudley and Ward (21 January 1750 – 25 April 1823) was a British peer and politician.

Ward was the son of John Ward, 1st Viscount Dudley and Ward, by his second wife Mary Carver. He was elected to the House of Commons for Worcester in 1780, a seat he held until 1788, when he succeeded his half-brother in the viscountcy and entered the House of Lords. In 1780 he married Julia Bosville, younger daughter of Godfrey Bosville of Gunthwaite, Yorkshire, and sister of the ardent Whig Colonel William Bosville (1745–1813). Ward died in April 1823, aged 73, and was succeeded by his son John, who served as Foreign Secretary and was created Earl of Dudley in 1827.

References

External links

1750 births
1823 deaths
Viscounts in the Peerage of Great Britain
Members of the Parliament of Great Britain for Worcester
William
British MPs 1780–1784
British MPs 1784–1790